Tachina angusta is a species of fly in the genus Tachina of the family Tachinidae that is endemic to France.

References

Insects described in 1854
Diptera of Europe
Endemic insects of Metropolitan France
angusta
Taxa named by Pierre-Justin-Marie Macquart